Hamza Ersan Saner (born 1966)  served as the Prime Minister of Northern Cyprus from 9 December 2020 to 5 November 2021.

President Ersin Tatar gave the task of establishing the government on 7 November 2020 to Ersan Saner, as he would temporarily serve as its chair until the National Unity Party Congress. After 14 days of contacts with other political parties, he was unable to form a government and returned the post on 21 November 2020. After the Leader of the Republican Turkish Party, Tufan Erhürman, who was given the task of forming the government, could not form the government, Ersan Saner was assigned to form the government for the second time on 7 December 2020. On 8 December 2020, the National Unity Party - Democratic Party and the Rebirth Party 
Coalition Government protocol was signed. He became the Prime Minister of Northern Cyprus when the list of ministers was approved by the President of the Republic Ersin Tatar on 9 December 2020.

Early life and education 
Saner was born in 1966 in Famagusta. He graduated from Trakya University, Department of Architecture in the year 1988.
Saner is married and has 2 children and speaks English.

Resignation
Saner was under pressure to resign after a video emerged of him masturbating while speaking to a scantily clad woman on the video app FaceTime.

On 13 October 2021, Saner informed President Tatar that his government has resigned. Per the Constitution of Northern Cyprus, he remained in office as the caretaker Prime Minister until the formation of a new government under Faiz Sucuoğlu.

References

1966 births
Living people
21st-century prime ministers of Northern Cyprus
Prime Ministers of Northern Cyprus
National Unity Party (Northern Cyprus) politicians
People from Famagusta
Trakya University alumni